Emergency medical services in Sri Lanka is being established using a public/private system aimed at the provision of emergency ambulance service, including emergency care and transportation to hospitals.  The Pre-Hospital Care Committee is part of the Trauma Secretariat  of the Sri Lanka Ministry of Healthcare and Nutrition and was established following the 2004 tsunami.  The goal of the Pre-Hospital Care Sub-Committee is “During this generation and continuing for future generations, everyone in Sri Lanka will have access to trained pre-hospital medical personnel, ambulances are available to transport the sick and injured safely to hospitals, complications from harmful or inadequate pre-hospital care is eliminated so physician and nursing personnel at hospitals are delivered patients they are able to professionally treat and rehabilitate back to society as contributing citizens.” Pre-Hospital care is an essential, core component of trauma system.

The emergency access number for Emergency Medical Services, reserved by the Telecommunications Regulatory Commission, for Sri Lanka is 1-1-0 and is operational in the districts of Colombo, Galle, Kandy, and Jaffna with plans to expand to provide national coverage.  In February 2009, the Jaffna District 1-1-0 communications center was opened with the opening call placed by Mr. James Moore, the Deputy Chief of Mission for the United States Embassy (Sri Lanka).

EMS Training

The pre-hospital care sub-committee has established minimum standards for EMT education in Sri Lanka. Currently, EMTs and Pre-Hospital personnel are currently working in four distinct areas: Fire Brigades, Hospitals, Community Based Organizations, and Private Services.

All Sri Lankan EMTs are trained on international EMS standards adopted by the Trauma Secretariat of the Ministry of Healthcare & Nutrition. The Sri Lankan standards are comparable to the National Registry of EMTs of USA (United States Department of Transportation Guidelines), the Australasia Registry of EMTs, and the UK College of Emergency Medicine standards.

EMT training in Sri Lanka is divided into four training levels.

EMT-Level 1: The Sri Lanka EMT-Level 1 is the first level of EMS training beyond community responders (First Aid and Advanced First Aid). Some countries refer to this level as Medical First Responders. Typically, first responders may be fire fighters, police officers, lifeguards, coaches, or teachers. Level 1 EMTs are trained in basic rescue, oxygen use, CPR, splinting, and safe ambulance operations.

EMT-Level 2: Level 2 EMTs are sometimes referred to as EMT-Basics or EMT-Ambulance Officers in other countries. Training at this level ideally requires 120–160 hours of classroom and clinical education for students to demonstrate the knowledge, attitude and skills required. Some examples of the skills of an EMT include:

- Airway management with the use of oral and nasal airways 
- Automatic External Defibrillators 
- Extrication of Trauma Patients with spinal injuries 
- Medical & Trauma Patient Assessments 
- Assisting patients with prescribed medications (NTG [gtn], aspirin, salbuterol inhalers) 
- Spinal Immobalization 
- Assessment of Vital Signs 
- Assisting with unexpected emergency deliveries during transport

EMT-Level 3: Level 3 EMTs or EMT-Intermediate Level is a more advanced professional level of pre-hospital care providers. Typically, level 3 EMTs are more senior and experienced EMTs and also have additional training in establishing IV cannulation, and in some areas limited access to lifesaving medications and advanced emergency airway management.

EMT-Level 4: Internationally, EMT-Paramedic represents the highest level pre-hospital care professionals. The skills, education, and protocols of Paramedics vary country to country. Although Sri Lanka will have Level-4 EMTs in the future, currently EMT-Paramedics, or Level-4 EMTs are not being trained in Sri Lanka and Sri Lankan Paramedics had to be sent for training in India for the 1990 service.

1990 service 

In 2015 India offered a gift to Sri Lanka in order to mark Prime Minister Ranil Wickremesinghe's visit Harsha De Silva proposed an emergency medical service after personal experiences with short comings in the Sri Lankan system as well as the urging of doctors. It was also backed by Wickremesighe resulting in India's world reputed GVK Emergency Response Institute offering training to hundreds of Sri Lankan EMTs and Paramedics as well as donating Ambulances and granting a 7.5 million dollar grant to start the service in Colombo and Galle as a first step. The Ambulance service was based on India's 108 service. The service was launched in 2016 with 250 highly trained EMTs, 250 pilots and 50 Call Centre Operators. The service gets its name from "1990" the toll free number used to call the service which is accessible from any network 24x7x365 through the Command and Control Center located in Rajagiriya. The service also praised by professionals

International Training Standards
In February 2011, Med1 (Pvt) Limited opened the first internationally certified training institute in Sri Lanka authorized to issue an internationally recognized certification in CPR, ACLS, PALS, or First Aid.  By implementing the ILCOR approved standards, doctors, nurses, and EMS providers in Sri Lanka now have access to internationally accredited certifications and evidenced based education.

EMT Training Materials

Textbook: The Ministry of Healthcare & Nutrition's Trauma Secretariat, with Medical Teams International, has published the first Emergency Medical Technician textbook in Sri Lanka in both the Singhalese and Tamil languages. This is actually the first Pre-Hospital Emergency Care textbook published in either language. Previously developed textbooks were reviewed and found ineffective because they were direct translations of North American texts and not specific to the South Asia region.  Translations were literal, had grammatical errors, and lacked a national context.  A team of American EMS instructors and Sri Lankan doctors reviewed EMS textbooks and wrote comparable, contextualized texts in Singhalese and Tamil languages.  Two textbooks were created over sixteen months that were specific to Sri Lanka and written by native speakers.  The books emphasized diseases common to Sri Lanka (including organophosphate poisoning and krait envenomation).  With the help of a graphic designer, all figures and photos are culturally appropriate.  The Sri Lankan Ministry of Healthcare has adopted the text for future training.

Skills DVD: To complement the textbook, and ensure skills were demonstrated uniformly in all future EMT courses, Medical Teams International and the Trauma Secretariat, produced a DVD demonstrating forty of the common Basic and Advanced Pre-Hospital skills. All skills were demonstrated by Sri Lankan EMTs or doctors in a local context.  Students and instructors can choose to play each clip in English, Singhalese, or Tamil.

References